Welshampton railway station was a station in Welshampton, Shropshire, England. The station was opened on 4 May 1863 and closed on 18 January 1965.

The station's facilities and single platform were located on the north side, despite this being further from both Welshampton and the nearest road.

See also
Welshampton rail crash

References

Further reading

Disused railway stations in Shropshire
Railway stations in Great Britain opened in 1863
Railway stations in Great Britain closed in 1965
Former Cambrian Railway stations
Beeching closures in England